Crameria is a monotypic moth genus in the family Noctuidae erected by Jacob Hübner in 1819. Its only species, Crameria amabilis, was first described by Dru Drury in 1773.

Description
Upperside: head brown. Antennae filiform. Thorax and abdomen yellow brown. Superior wings fine darkish red, with several yellow spots thereon of different shapes, each encircled with black; the posterior and external edges having yellow margins. Posterior wings deep yellow, inclining to orange, with a black oval spot near the middle of each. Along the external edges is a black margin, reaching from the upper to the abdominal corners; the upper edge being scalloped.

Underside: legs, sides, thorax, and abdomen pale orange. Anterior wings entirely pale orange and dusky black, without any mixture of red, etc. Posterior wings as on the upperside; the colours being less distinct. Margins of the wings entire.

Wingspan  inches (38 mm).

Distribution
It is found in Angola, Benin, Burundi, Cameroon, the Democratic Republic of the Congo, Eritrea, Ethiopia, Gabon, Ghana, Ivory Coast, Kenya, Malawi, Mali, Nigeria, Rwanda, Senegal, Sierra Leone, South Africa, Sudan, Tanzania, the Gambia, Uganda, Zambia and Zimbabwe.

References

Agaristinae
Moths described in 1773
Descriptions from Illustrations of Exotic Entomology
Monotypic moth genera
Taxa named by Dru Drury